Darkhast Jamal Khan is a town and union council of Dera Ghazi Khan District in the Punjab province of Pakistan. It is located at 29°41'50N 70°28'20E and has an altitude of 112 metres (370 feet).

References

Populated places in Dera Ghazi Khan District
Union councils of Dera Ghazi Khan District
Cities and towns in Punjab, Pakistan